A by-election was held on 13 April 2019 for the Negeri Sembilan State Legislative Assembly seat of Rantau. The seat became vacant after the uncontested election of incumbent Mohamad Hasan of the United Malays National Organisation (UMNO), a component of Barisan Nasional (BN) coalition was declared null and void.

In the 2018 elections, Mohamad Hasan, the 3-term former Menteri Besar of Negeri Sembilan won the seat uncontested after People's Justice Party (PKR)’s candidate Dr Streram Sinnansamy was not allowed to enter the Nomination Centre to file his papers. However, the Election Court has on the 16 November 2018, allowed the petition by Dr S. Streram and passed a ruling that Mohamad Hasan had not been duly elected. A fresh elections was called to be held after Mohamad Hasan's appeal was dismissed by the Federal Court on 18 February 2019.
 
The nomination day was on 30 March, with a about 2-week campaigning period until election day. The constituency has 20,926 registered voters- 20,804 ordinary voters, 118 early voters and four absentee voters.

Barisan Nasional's Mohamad Hasan won the by-election with a 4,510 majority to retain the seat again. It is the third consecutive by-election victory for the BN coalition. The other two being the Cameron Highlands and Semenyih by-elections.

Nominations 
The UMNO acting president Mohamad Hasan declared he is ready to defend the Rantau seat again, after the Federal Court upheld an Election Court's ruling to nullify the result of him winning the seat unopposed in the last general election.

Meanwhile, Dr S. Streram, an anaesthetist who is the Rembau PKR deputy chief, said he would leave the candidacy to the party leadership and vowed not to contest as an independent if he was not selected as candidate for the Rantau by-election. On 11 March 2019, he was chosen as the PH candidate for the by-election.

PKR member and businessman, Hazan Khalid initially decided on 27 March 2019 that he would contest as an independent candidate after he disagreed with the candidacy of Dr S. Streram, as the PH candidate. However he didn't turn up to file his papers on Nomination Day.

On Nomination Day, alongside Mohamad Hasan and Dr S. Streram, two independents, retired teacher Mohd Nor Yasin (pen logo) and housewife Malar Rajaram (tree logo) submitted their papers. The EC confirmed a four-cornered fight for the by-election.

Controversies and issues
Dr S. Streram was alleged to borrowed and failed to repay Segamat Member of Parliament Datuk Seri Dr R. Santhara Kumar a debt of RM60,000 for his child's education which he claimed that he had repaid the debt in full. PH chairman Tun Dr Mahathir Mohamad said that Dr S. Streram  was selected as candidate as he is not a bankrupt and PH is upholding its principles as Dr S. Streram was denied from a fair contest in the 14th general election.

Mohamad Hasan told the public to look into his past contributions before calling him a racist. Mohamad's past speeches which purportedly touch on vernacular schools and remarks describing non-Malays were which alleged to be racists and has sparked outrage among the public.

Independent candidate, Mohd Nor Yassin had been confirmed to be a member of National Trust Party (AMANAH). The party planned to expel him from the party for contesting as an independent and not supporting the PH Candidate. Mohd Nor Yassin was also the Pan-Malaysian Islamic Party (PAS) candidate for the state constituency of Gemencheh during the 2013 general election. He was expelled from AMANAH on the same day.

Former Malacca Chief Minister, Idris Haron promised in a campaign speech that if BN won the by-election, they will provide two goats for a feast. EC Chairman, Azhar Harun, has confirmed that it's an election offense.

A provocation banner displaying sensitive and racism messages has been hung up in the Rantau area. Mohamad Hasan, the BN candidate has denied claims of BN hanging the banner. Streram meanwhile lodged a police report on the matter.

A case involving an RM10 million being remitted and transferred through a money changer by Mohamad to buy a luxury apartment in London has been brought up by the Speaker of the Negeri Sembilan State Legislative Assembly. Mohamad however has denied claims of any wrongdoing by him. Mohamad was asked to explain the reason he used a money changer instead of a bank to transfer RM10 million and also his connection on a RM6 million Minangkabau design bungalow in Seremban.

A video emerged of five individuals in clothing bearing PH logos searching a police car on polling day as they suspected extra ballot boxes were being ferried in the vehicle, but their search only turned up to be false alarm.

Meanwhile, arguments and physical fights among the PKR machinery members had erupted at the PH's Rantau command centre following unofficial reports of its candidate Dr S. Streram's defeat in the Rantau by-election. The incident was said to be happened because of misunderstanding and disagreement over the machinery payment.

Results

Results according to polling districts

Early and post votes

Previous results

References 

2019 elections in Malaysia
By-elections in Malaysia
Elections in Negeri Sembilan